Mohamed Mounir (born October 10, 1954) is an Egyptian singer and actor, with a musical career spanning more than four decades. He incorporates various genres into his music, including classical Egyptian music, Nubian music, blues, jazz and reggae. His lyrics are noted both for their philosophical content and for their passionate social and political commentary. He is affectionately known by his fans as "El King" in reference to his album and play "El Malek Howwa El Malek" (The King is The King). Mounir's family is from Nubia, Southern Aswan, Egypt.

In April 2021, he appeared in the opening musical sequence as a singer for the Pharaohs' Golden Parade on an Egyptian funerary boat on the lake in front of the National Museum of Egyptian Civilization.

Early life
Born into a Nubian family in Aswan, Mounir spent most of his early childhood in the village of Manshyat Al Nubia, where he shared his father's interests in both music and politics. As a teenager, he and his family were forced to relocate to Cairo when his village was lost in the floods that followed the construction of the Aswan Dam. It was here that he studied photography at the Faculty of Applied Arts at Helwan University. During this period, he would often sing for friends and family at social gatherings. His singing voice was noticed by the lyricist Abdel-Rehim Mansour, who would go on to introduce Mounir to the renowned folk singer Ahmed Mounib.

Musical career
Following his college graduation, he was called up for military service in 1974, during which he continued his professional musical career by performing in various concerts. He performed his first such concert in 1975. Although the public were initially critical of Mounir for performing in casual attire at a time where many Egyptian singers were expected to wear suits, they eventually warmed to his laidback image.

After completing his military service, Mounir released his 1977 debut solo album Alemony Eneeki on the Sonar record label. Mounir went on to release five more consecutive official albums and featured on one soundtrack album under the Sonar label. To date, Mounir has released a total 22 official albums and featured on six soundtrack albums under a number of different record labels.

Mounir's single "Maddad" from this album caused controversy, as its lyrics could be interpreted as a call for intercession from the prophet Muhammad. Among Muslims, there are differing views as to whether the prophet can provide intercession between Allah and his believers. This resulted in the music video being banned from Egyptian television for a time. Mounir responded by saying "It is this fight against rigid thought that makes something out of you".

On his 2003 follow-up album "Ahmar Shafayef" (Lipstick), he returned to his more familiar style of mainly secular lyrics. In the summer of 2003, following the release of this album, Mounir toured Austria, Germany and Switzerland alongside the Austrian pop musician Hubert von Goisern, and later that year the two musicians performed at a concert in Asyut.

In May 2004, he held a large concert at the pyramids of Giza, during which he was physically attacked by a drunken fan. Despite sustaining minor injuries, he continued his performance until the end of the concert.

He continued recording albums infused with social commentary with the release of his 2005 album Embareh Kan Omry Eshren (Yesterday I Was Twenty) and his album Ta'm El Beyout (Taste of Homes), released in 2008. Ta'm El Beyout was noted for its creativity, but initially did not perform as well as expected in terms of album sales. In 2012, Mounir released his album Ya Ahl El Arab we Tarab.

In 2008, Mounir postponed his New Year's Eve concert at Cairo Opera House in solidarity with the Palestinians suffering the effects of the Gaza War. He issued the statement: "Delaying the concert is a message sent to the whole world, so that it would move forward and help the people in Gaza."

He headlined the Liverpool Arabic Arts Festival 2010 on July 9, at the Liverpool Philharmonic Hall. He is the predecessor to recent musical groups like Black Theama

In February 2021, Mounir announced that he would be playing at concerts in Jerusalem, Haifa, Ramallah and Gaza City, to be the first Egyptian musician to perform in Israel, as he mentioned: "I will be a peace delegate, like Sadat". However, he later declared that he would only tour the Palestinian cities of Ramallah and Gaza.

Acting career
As well as his career as a popular singer, Mounir also has an active acting career. Throughout his career he has appeared in 12 movies, 4 television series and 3 plays. His movie career began in 1982, when he acted in Youssef Chahine's film Hadouta Masreia (An Egyptian Story), also being featured on the soundtrack album. In 1997 he played the role of the bard in another movie by Youssef Chahine, the French-Egyptian historical drama Al Maseer (Destiny), which was screened out of competition at the 1997 Cannes Film Festival.

Mounir played the part of the blind poetry professor "Bashir" in the controversial 2005 film Dunia, which centers around the title character Dunia, a belly dancer and poet played by Egyptian actress Hanan Tork. When the film was shown at the 2005 Cairo International Film Festival, it left the audience split between those supporting the film's calls for women's rights and its message against female genital mutilation, and those disapproving of either the title character's desire to express herself through dance, or of the scenes shot in Cairo's slums, judged as tarnishing Egypt's international image.

Discography

Official albums
 Alemony Eneeki (Your Eyes Taught Me) – 1977
 Bnetweled (We Are Being Born) – 1978
 Shababeek (Windows) YKB – 1981
 Etkalemy (Speak) YKB – 1983
 Bareea(innocent) YKB – 1986
 West El Dayra (In The Middle of The Circle) YKB – 1987
 Shokolata (Chocolate) – 1989
 Ya Eskenderia (O Alexandria) – 1990
 Meshwar (Trip) – 1991
 El Tool We El Loon We El Horya (The Length, Colour, and Freedom) – 1992
 Eftah Albak (Open Your Heart) – 1994
 Momken (Maybe) – 1995
 Men Awel Lamsa (From The First Touch) – 1996
 El Farha (The Joy) – 1999
 Fi Eshg El Banat (The Love of Girls) – 2000
 Ana Alby Masaken Shabya (My Heart is Public housing) – 2001
 El Ard... El Salam (The Earth... Peace) – 2002
 Ahmar Shafayef (Lipsticks) – 2003
 Embareh Kan Omry Eshren (Yesterday I Was Twenty) – 2005
 Ta'm El Beyout (Taste of Homes) – 2008
 Ahl El Arab Wel Tarab (People Of Arabs and Music) – 2012
 El-Rooh Lel-Rooh Dayman Bet'hen (Souls Always Long for Each other) – 2017
 Watan (Homeland) – 2018
  Bab El Jamal (Door of Beauty) - 2021 AA
YKB: Featuring Yahia Khalil's band

Filmography

Movies

Television
 Bakkar
 Ali Elewa
 Gomhoreyat Zefta (Republic of Zefta) 
 Al Moghani (The Singer)

Theatre
 El Malek;  El Malek Al Shahateen Masa' Al Kheer Ya Masr''

Awards 

 He received the Peace Award from CNN for his album Earth Peace
 Received the Diamond Award from "Bama Awards"
 He won the Best Singer award in the July 2008 MEMA competition.
 He was honored by the management of the Alexandria Film Festival at the opening of its 30th session
 He won the Platinum Award for the best Egyptian and Arab singer for the song "Yasmina", in which the international singer Adel Al-Taweel participated with the "Ich und Ich" team, the most famous international band at present, and he deserved the Universal International Award, after he distributed the disc that includes the song "Taht Al-Yasmina” 700,000 copies, achieving the highest distribution rate in Germany. Mounir also won, in the same year and for the same song, in Arabic and English, third place in the public referendum organized by the “Proseven” channel for the competition for the best song in Germany.
 The song "El-leila Samra" won a BBC poll of the 50 best African songs of the twentieth century.
 He also won the Honorable Award in 2005 for the movie "Dunya".

References

External links

 
 

1954 births
Living people
20th-century Egyptian male singers
Egyptian male film actors
Egyptian people of Nubian descent
Egyptian male television actors
Egyptian male stage actors
People from Aswan Governorate
21st-century Egyptian male singers
Singers who perform in Egyptian Arabic
English-language singers from Egypt